Carmen Rodríguez (born 15 July 1972) is a Guatemalan fencer. She competed in the women's individual foil event at the 1996 Summer Olympics.

References

External links
 

1972 births
Living people
Guatemalan female foil fencers
Olympic fencers of Guatemala
Fencers at the 1996 Summer Olympics